Simon Simon (fl. 1735-1788) was a French harpsichordist and composer.

Simon Simon may also refer to:

Simon, Simon, a 1970 comedy short film directed by Graham Stark
"Simon Simon", a 1988 single by Dale Bozzio from the album Riot in English
The Amazing Adventures of Simon Simon, a 1981 album by John Surman and Jack DeJohnette
Simon & Simon, an American detective television series